Gyalopion canum, commonly known as the Western hooknose snake, is a species of small colubrid snake endemic to the deserts of the United States and Mexico. It is sometimes referred to as the Chihuahuan hook-nosed snake because it is commonly found in the Chihuahuan Desert.

Taxonomy
The Western hooknose snake was originally described as a species new to science in 1860 by Edward Drinker Cope, who at that time named it Gyalopion canum. However, in 1883 Samuel Garman reassigned this species to the genus Ficimia, changing its scientific name to Ficimia cana. (Because Gyalopion is neuter, and Ficimia is feminine, the ending of the specific name had to be changed from "-um " to "-a "). After slightly more than 100 years, Robert C. Stebbins in 1985 returned this species to the genus Gyalopion, as Gyalopion canum, due to distinct morphological characteristics.

Geographic range
G. canum is found in the United States, from western Texas to southeastern Arizona, and into northern and central Mexico.

Description
It is gray or grayish brown in color, with 25-48 dark brown or black blotches down the back, and a cream-colored underside. It has a slightly upturned snout, to which the common name, "hooknose", refers.

The smooth dorsal scales are arranged in 17 rows at midbody.

Behavior
G. canum is a nocturnal burrower, most often found under rocks.

Habitat
The Western hooknose snake prefers slightly sandy habitats, near a permanent water source.

Diet
The diet of G. canum consists primarily of spiders and centipedes, but it will also eat small snakes and scorpions.

Reproduction
The Western hooknose snake is oviparous. Sexually mature females may lay up to 5 eggs in June.

Defense
One of the primary defensive behaviors of G. canum is to make a popping noise with its cloaca, i.e., farting. According to an article in the August, 2000 issue of Discover magazine, during a laboratory experiment carried out by Bruce Young, a morphologist at Lafayette College, the snakes only farted when they felt threatened, and some farted so energetically that they lifted themselves off the ground.

Speed
Gyalopion canum is quick in short bursts or spurts.

References

Further reading
Conant R (1975). A Field Guide to Reptiles and Amphibians of Eastern and Central North America. Boston: Houghton Mifflin. xviii + 429 pp. + Plates 1-48.  (hardcover),  (paperback). (Gyalopion canum, p. 217 + Plate 33 + Map 161).
Cope ED (1860). "Catalogue of the Colubridæ in the Museum of the Academy of Natural Sciences of Philadelphia, with notes and descriptions of new species, Part 2". Proc. Acad. Nat. Sci. Philadelphia 12: 241–266. (Gyalopion canum, new species, p. 243).
Schmidt KP, Davis DD (1941). Field Book of Snakes of the United States and Canada. New York: G.P. Putnam's Sons. 365 pp. (Ficimia cana, pp. 202–203, Figure 65).
Wright AH, Wright AA (1957). Handbook of Snakes of the United States and Canada. Ithaca and London: Comstock Publishing Assosciates, a division of Cornell University Press. 1,105 pp. (in 2 volumes). (Gyalopion canum, pp. 282–287, Figure 87, Map 26).

External links

Herps of Texas: Gyalopion canum 

Colubrids
Fauna of the Chihuahuan Desert
Reptiles of the United States
Reptiles of Mexico
Reptiles described in 1860